This article attempts to list the oldest extant buildings surviving in the state of Delaware in the United States of America, including the oldest houses in Delaware and any other surviving structures. Some dates are approximate and based upon dendrochronology, architectural studies, and historical records. Sites on the list are generally from the First Period of American architecture or earlier.
To be listed here a site must:
date from prior to 1776; or
be the oldest building in a county, large city, or oldest of its type (church, government building, etc.),

See also
List of the oldest buildings in the United States
National Register of Historic Places listings in Delaware

References 

Architecture in Delaware
Oldest
Delaware